Philippe Audet (born June 4, 1977) is a Canadian former professional ice hockey player. He played 4 games in the National Hockey League with the Detroit Red Wings during the 1998–99 season. The rest of his career, which lasted from 1997 to 2013, was spent in various minor leagues and briefly in Europe.

Playing career
Audet was born in Ottawa, Ontario. As a youth, he played in the 1991 Quebec International Pee-Wee Hockey Tournament with a minor ice hockey team from Beauce, Quebec. He was drafted by the Detroit Red Wings 52nd overall in the 1995 NHL Entry Draft, later playing with that team in the National Hockey League in their 1998–99 season.After playing for the Red Wings, he played for two teams in the AHL, as well as a team in Elitserien and a team in Deutsche Eishockey Liga.

Career statistics

Regular season and playoffs

References

External links

1977 births
Living people
Adirondack Red Wings players
AIK IF players
Augsburger Panther players
Canadian ice hockey left wingers
Cincinnati Mighty Ducks players
Detroit Red Wings draft picks
Detroit Red Wings players
Essen Mosquitoes players
Granby Bisons players
Granby Prédateurs players
Ice hockey people from Ottawa
People from Laurentides
Ligue Nord-Américaine de Hockey players
Springfield Falcons players